Global Family Day One Day of Peace and Sharing, is celebrated every 1st January in the United States as a global day of peace and sharing. Global Family Day grew out of the United Nations Millennium celebration, "One Day In Peace".

History
Originally supported in the United States by Linda Grover, the efforts to promote the date included a 1996 children's book One Day In Peace, 2000 by Steve Diamond and also Robert Alan Silverstein, which was translated into 22 languages, and a utopian novel Tree Island by Grover herself.

References

January observances